Frank Athen Walls (born October 12, 1967) is an American serial killer who has been sentenced to death for murdering five people in Ocean City, Florida between 1985 and 1987. His murders were robbery based, and his preferred weapon of choice was a knife or a gun. He was arrested at the young age of 19 on July 24, 1987, making him one of the youngest serial killers in American history. He was sentenced to death in 1991, but was re-tried and sentenced to death again in 1994.

Events 
Walls' roommate went to the police and implicated him in the murders, and after a search of Walls' apartment, items were found that were stolen from the crime scene. He was arrested on July 24. After his arrest, Walls was implicated in the unsolved murders of Cynthia Sue Condra, (Age 19) and Tommie Lou Whiddon, (Age 19) who were murdered on March 26, 1985, when Walls was only 17. He was also linked by circumstantial evidence to the murder of Audrey Gygi, (Age 47) who was murdered on May 2, 1987. Walls was convicted of the murders and was sentenced to death in 1991. However, a new trial occurred in 1994, and Walls was re-sentenced to death.

See also 
 List of death row inmates in the United States
 List of serial killers in the United States

References 

1967 births
1985 murders in the United States
1987 murders in the United States
20th-century American criminals
American male criminals
American people convicted of murder
American prisoners sentenced to death
American serial killers
Living people
Male serial killers
People convicted of murder by Florida
Prisoners sentenced to death by Florida